Camren Renee Bicondova (born May 22, 1999) is an American former actress and dancer. She is best known for her role as Selina Kyle / Catwoman on the Fox television crime-drama Gotham (2014–2019).

Life and career 

Bicondova was born in San Diego, California. Bicondova got her start as a performer when she was enrolled in dance class at the age of six. After her family relocated to Hawaii, Bicondova studied at a local studio where she took up jazz-funk and hip hop styles of dance. By age 11, she had become an "Elite protégé" for The PULSE on Tour dance convention, traveling the country as an assistant to some of the nation's top teachers and choreographers.

Bicondova garnered mainstream attention in the 2012 dance-drama film Battlefield America. That same year, her all-girl dance group 8 Flavahz was runner-up in the seventh season of America's Best Dance Crew.

In 2014, Bicondova was cast as the young Selina Kyle on Fox's television series Gotham. She earned a Saturn Award nomination for Best Performance by a Younger Actor in a Television Series for season 1. In September 2015, she was listed in Varietys annual Youth Impact Report, as an artist who "represents the next wave of Hollywood savvy and talent". In April 2019, Bicondova decided to not be in the series finale and was replaced by actress Lili Simmons for the 10-year flash forward scenes. Also in 2014, she was in the "Enjoy the Ride" music video by Krewella.

Philanthropy 
Bicondova has lent her support to a number of non-profits and charitable causes including The USO, NOH8 Campaign, Global Citizen Festival and North Shore Animal League America.

Filmography

Awards and nominations

Personal life 
Bicondova lives with her Tonkinese cat, named Mr. G.

References

External links 

 
 

1999 births
American hip hop dancers
American female dancers
American dancers
American child actresses
Actresses from San Diego
American film actresses
American television actresses
21st-century American actresses
Living people